Minister for Public Administration may refer to:
 Minister for Public Administration (Italy)
 Minister for Public Administration (Sweden)